Claudio Pätz (born 1 July 1987) is a Swiss curler from Uster. He won gold medal with the Swiss team at the 2013 European Curling Championships in Stavanger and a bronze medal at the 2014 World Men's Curling Championship as the alternate for the Swiss team. He competed at the 2013 World Curling Championships, and at the 2014 Winter Olympics in Sochi.

Personal life
Pätz is employed as an accountant. and is married. His sister is the 2012, 2015, 2019, 2021 and 2022 world champion curler Alina Pätz.

References

External links

1987 births
Living people
Curlers at the 2014 Winter Olympics
Curlers at the 2018 Winter Olympics
Swiss male curlers
Olympic curlers of Switzerland
Sportspeople from Zürich
People from Uster
European curling champions
Continental Cup of Curling participants
Olympic bronze medalists for Switzerland
Medalists at the 2018 Winter Olympics
Olympic medalists in curling
21st-century Swiss people